Indirect presidential elections were held in the Czech Republic on 26 January 1993 to elect the first president of the newly independent country. The president was elected by the members of the Czech Republic Parliament, with Václav Havel emerging as the winner. The election was complicated only by attacks of Republicans against Havel and by bomb threat to the Parliament.

Candidates
Václav Havel - former president of Czechoslovakia and a candidate of governing coalition (ODS, KDU–ČSL and ODA).
Marie Stiborová - leader of the Left Bloc (coalition of parties KSČM and SDL). 
Miroslav Sládek - leader of SPR–RSČ.

Opinion polls

Parties in parliament

Results
All 200 Members of Parliament voted. Six of them submitted invalid ballots while 22 submitted empty ballots. Havel received 109 votes and thus won the election in the first round. Communist candidate Stiborová received only 49 votes and Republican candidate Sládek only 14 votes. This is the only presidential election in which the president was voted and elected only by Chamber of Deputies. Havel received 109 votes. It was expected that Havel will receive much more votes because governing coalition had 105 votes and part of opposition promised support to Havel. It is very likely that he didn't receive some votes from Civic Democrats and Christian Democrats (from KDS). Havel was inaugurated on 2 February 1993 and became the first president of the Czech Republic.

References

 
Presidential election
Presidential election
Indirect elections
Presidential elections in the Czech Republic
Czech presidential election